is a 2008 Japanese horror movie based on a Kazuo Umezu manga directed by Yūdai Yamaguchi.

The original manga and previously been an inspiration for the 1968 film The Snake Girl and the Silver-Haired Witch.

External links
 

2008 horror films
2008 films
Live-action films based on manga
Films directed by Yūdai Yamaguchi
Japanese horror films
Kazuo Umezu
2000s Japanese films